Paul Alger (born 13 August 1943 in Bonn) is a former German footballer. Between 1966 and 1968, Alger played for 1. FC Köln. In 1968, he helped Köln to a victory of the DFB-Pokal after being substituted in the 46th minute.

Honours
 DFB-Pokal: 1967–68

References

1943 births
German footballers
Living people
Bundesliga players
FC Viktoria Köln players
Sportspeople from Bonn
Association football forwards
Footballers from North Rhine-Westphalia